Olhugiri as a place name may refer to:
 Olhugiri (Baa Atoll) (Republic of Maldives)
 Olhugiri (Lhaviyani Atoll) (Republic of Maldives)
 Olhugiri (Thaa Atoll) (Republic of Maldives)